Mariia Lafina (born 7 May 1993) is a Ukrainian Paralympic swimmer. She represented Ukraine at the 2016 Summer Paralympics in Rio de Janeiro, Brazil and she won the silver medal in the women's 50 metre breaststroke SB3.

At the 2014 European Championships she won two gold medals and three bronze medals.

At the 2015 World Championships she won the silver medal in the women's 150 metre individual medley event.

At the 2016 European Championships she won one gold medal, four silver medals and one bronze medal.

References

External links 
 
 Mariia Lafina – Glasgow 2015 IPC Swimming World Championships at the International Paralympic Committee

1993 births
Living people
Ukrainian female breaststroke swimmers
Paralympic swimmers of Ukraine
Paralympic silver medalists for Ukraine
Swimmers at the 2016 Summer Paralympics
Medalists at the 2016 Summer Paralympics
Medalists at the World Para Swimming Championships
Place of birth missing (living people)
Paralympic medalists in swimming
Ukrainian female medley swimmers
S4-classified Paralympic swimmers
21st-century Ukrainian women